M. Morrison Jackson (April 1, 1918 – December 12, 2004) was a member of the Ohio Senate.

A native of Cleveland, Jackson served in the state Senate from 1967 to 1984.  The most senior African American Senator at his time, he held a number of leadership roles during his time.  In 1982, upon the Senate's switch to a Democratic majority, Jackson was involved in a Republican coup in which he was promised the position of Senate President if he switched party affiliations.  Ultimately, however, he remained with Democrats, and Harry Meshel became the next Senate leader.

He retired in 1984, and was succeeded by future Cleveland Mayor Michael R. White.

References

Democratic Party Ohio state senators
1918 births
2004 deaths
20th-century American politicians